Park Bottom is a hamlet north of Pool and near Illogan in west Cornwall, England.
The village centers around one junction in the lower part of the town. This 5-way junction has roads leading to Camborne, Illogan, Portreath and Pool.
The village has three commercial buildings in the centre, a Premier convenience store, a pub called The New Inn and a hair salon.

References

Hamlets in Cornwall